Languages of Montenegro are languages that are spoken in Montenegro. According to the Constitution of Montenegro, adopted in 2007, Montenegro has only one official language, specified as Montenegrin. However, at the 2011 census, 42% of the population declared Serbian to be their native language, while Montenegrin was the second most common at 37%. Both Montenegrin and Serbian are standardized varieties of the Serbo-Croatian language, alongside Bosnian and Croatian. However, an official standard for Montenegrin is still in the process of being formulated. The Montenegrin language is written in the Latin and Cyrillic alphabets, but there is a growing political movement to use only the Latin alphabet. 

Legally recognized minority languages are Albanian, Bosnian, and Croatian. As of 2017, Albanian is an official language of the municipalities of Podgorica, Ulcinj, Bar, Pljevlja, Rozaje and Tuzi.
Additionally, there are a few hundred Italians in Montenegro, concentrated in the Bay of Kotor (Cattaro).

Minority languages of Montenegro 

The European Charter for Regional or Minority Languages entered into force in Montenegro in June 2006, following the independence of Montenegro from the State Union of Serbia and Montenegro on 3 June 2006. The Constitution of Montenegro from 2007 states that Montenegrin is the official language of the country, while Bosnian, Croatian, Serbian and Albanian are languages in official use. The Constitution states that languages in official use are those of groups that form at least 1% of the population of Montenegro, as per the 2003 population census. The Law on National Minorities specifies that the percentage of members of national minorities in total population of the local government should be 15% in order for their language and script to be introduced in official use. Media founded by the Montenegro government are obliged to broadcast news, cultural, educational, sports and entertainment programs in minority languages. Minorities and their members have the right to education in their language in regular and vocational education.

Dialects

See also

Controversy over ethnic and linguistic identity in Montenegro
Declaration on the Common Language
Language secessionism in Serbo-Croatian

References